Jamie Gray may refer to: 
Jamie Gray (footballer) (born 1998), Irish footballer, currently playing for Stevenage
Jamie Gray (murderer), a British murderer
Jamie Gray Hyder (born 1985), American actress and model
Jamie Lynn Gray (born 1984), American Olympic sport shooter

See also
James Gray (disambiguation)